Daniel Gurrión Matías (born 30 January 1958) is a Mexican politician from the Institutional Revolutionary Party. FIn 2009 he served as Deputy of the LX Legislature of the Mexican Congress representing Oaxaca.

References

1958 births
Living people
People from Oaxaca
Institutional Revolutionary Party politicians
21st-century Mexican politicians
Deputies of the LX Legislature of Mexico
Members of the Chamber of Deputies (Mexico) for Oaxaca